Cisco is an unincorporated community within Magoffin County, Kentucky, United States.

The town was established in 1902 and is said to have been named for the first postmaster Hatler Cisco.

References

Unincorporated communities in Magoffin County, Kentucky
Unincorporated communities in Kentucky